Hai  is one of the seven districts of the Kilimanjaro Region of Tanzania.The district covers approximately .  It is bordered to the southwest by the Meru District of Arusha Region, to the west by the Siha District, and to the east by the Moshi Urban District and Moshi Rural District and the Rombo District to the far north.
The western breach part of Mount Kilimanjaro is located in the Hai District.
According to the 2012 census, the population of the Hai District was 210,533.

Administrative subdivisions

Wards 
The Hai District is divided administratively into 10 wards:

 Hai Mjini
 Machame Kaskazini
 Machame Kusini
 Machame Magharibi
 Machame Mashariki
 Machame Uroki
 Masama Kusini
 Masama Magharibi
 Masama Mashariki
 Masama Rundugai

In the Hai District, 80 percent of inhabitants have clean drinking water, and there are two new water supply schemes under construction to help the rest of the population. These are owned and operated by the people of Hai, and this makes them accountable for their own water.

References

Districts of Kilimanjaro Region